Phil McSpadden is an American softball coach. With a record of 1,860–404, he has more wins than any other coach in the history of college softball. He has led the Oklahoma City University softball team to eleven NAIA national titles in 1994, 1995, 1996, 1997, 2000, 2001, 2002, 2007, 2016, 2017, and 2022.
 He was inducted into the National Fastpitch Coaches Association Hall of Fame in 2014.

See also
National Fastpitch Coaches Association Hall of Fame
List of college softball coaches with 1,000 wins

References

Living people
American softball coaches
Oklahoma City Stars softball coaches
Place of birth missing (living people)
Year of birth missing (living people)